Seništa is a village in the municipality of Nova Varoš, western Serbia. According to the 2002 census, the village has a population of 262 people.

Notable members of Selaković family, such as Nikola Selaković and Marko Selakovic, originate from Seništa.

References

Populated places in Zlatibor District